Aulonemia madidiensis is an Aulonemia species of bamboo.
It is part of the grass family and endemic to Latin America.

References

madidiensis